See also Lake City Correctional Facility in Lake City, Florida

The Lake Correctional Institution  is a state prison for men located in Clermont, Lake County, Florida, owned and operated by the Florida Department of Corrections.  With a mix of security levels including community, minimum, medium, close, and maximum. This facility was opened in 1973 and has a maximum capacity of 1093 prisoners.

References

Prisons in Florida
Buildings and structures in Lake County, Florida
1973 establishments in Florida
Clermont, Florida